is a Japanese film released in 1970. It features Sonny Chiba. It is first film in the Yakuza Deka series.

Cast 
 Sonny Chiba as 
 Nenji Kobayashi as Sasaki
 Rinichi Yamamoto as Okura
 Akira Kume as Kito
 Ryoji Hayama as Goro Miura
 Asao Uchida as Yashiro
 Jūkei Fujioka  as Chief Detective
Ryōhei Uchida as Tetsuji Asai

References

External links

1970 films
1970 action films
Yakuza films
Japanese martial arts films
1970s Japanese-language films
Toei Company films
Tokyo Metropolitan Police Department in fiction
1970s Japanese films